The Streets at Southpoint is a shopping mall in Durham, North Carolina. Located near I-40, on Fayetteville Road, the mall was developed by Urban Retail Properties and is currently owned and managed by Brookfield Properties, a subsidiary of Brookfield Asset Management.

The Streets at Southpoint opened in 2002. , the mall is anchored by AMC Theatres and department stores Belk, J. C. Penney, Macy's, and Nordstrom. Previous anchors include Consolidated Theatres and department stores Hecht's and Sears.

History 
The Streets at Southpoint took four years of planning and over two years of construction.  It opened on March 8, 2002, with anchors Hecht's (now Macy's), Sears, JCPenney, Belk, and Nordstrom. The mall had around 300,000 visitors during its first three days of operation.  The mall is home to many firsts for the area, including North Carolina's first Nordstrom and Apple Store.  Other stores that were new to the Research Triangle area included Aveda, California Pizza Kitchen,  Hollister Co., and Pottery Barn Kids.  The Streets at Southpoint was the first mall to come to the Durham area in nearly three decades. The opening of the mall was chosen as the most important story of the year in Durham's Top 10 Business Stories of 2002.

On December 28, 2018, Sears announced it would be shuttering its location at the mall as part of a plan to close 80 stores nationwide. The store closed in March 2019.

Southpoint Cinemas is an AMC movie megaplex that totals more than 56,000 square feet. The cinema is open 365 days a year.

List of anchor stores

Architecture 
The Streets at Southpoint was designed and developed by Urban Retail Properties with an old-fashioned Main Street concept.  RTKL Associates Inc. served as the architect and also provided environmental graphic design services, incorporating the logo design throughout the development, reinforcing the shopping center's identity. The mall is a "hybrid mall," combining a traditional enclosed mall with an outdoor pedestrian wing. A 70-feet glass wall separates the two portions of the mall.  

The Streets at Southpoint's developer, Jim Farrell, wanted to add to the Main Street feel, envisaging playing children as a fixture of the mall.  He enlisted A.R.T. Design Group to create statues of some of the children of local leaders.  There are 23 statues in total throughout the mall, taking three years to create.

Over 2 million red bricks were used to line both the exterior and interior of the mall. Architects were inspired by downtown of Durham and the brick façades of the buildings at UNC and on Franklin Street. Hand rails throughout the mall include pieces of maps of Durham.  The food court, entitled "Fork in the Road," was inspired by old tobacco warehouses.

A 70-foot smokestack can be found at the end of the outdoor stretch of the mall in an effort to pay homage to the heritage of downtown Durham. Mature trees and shrubbery were shipped in from other locations in order to make the mall seem as if it has been in Durham for a long time. The outdoor Main Street includes larger retailers and stand-alone restaurants such as The Cheesecake Factory.

Reception 
The mall received 1 million visitors every month in its opening year.

Gallery

References

External links 

Streets at Southpoint Official Site
Urban Retail Properties

Brookfield Properties
Shopping malls in North Carolina
Shopping malls established in 2002
Buildings and structures in Durham, North Carolina
Tourist attractions in Durham, North Carolina
2002 establishments in North Carolina